The SS City of Bagdad was a British merchant ship built for the Ellerman Lines that was captured and sunk by the German raider Atlantis on 11 July 1940.

The crew were kept prisoner for 107 days on the Atlantis before transferring to Durmitor. The captain of City of Bagdad, J. Armstrong White, would later become friends with the captain of the Atlantis, Bernhard Rogge, and her adjutant Ulrich Mohr. In 1956, White wrote an account of the events in the foreword to Mohr's book Ship 16.

Originally ordered for the Hansa Line as Geierfels, the 7,490 gross register ton ship was launched on 8 November 1919 and completed in June 1920 before being turned over to the British as reparations after World War I.

References

External links
http://www.ddghansa-shipsphotos.de/geierfels100.htm
http://www.sscityofcairo.co.uk/warlosses.php

Maritime incidents in July 1940
1919 ships
World War II shipwrecks in the Indian Ocean